Rhombophryne coronata is a frog of the family Microhylidae. It is endemic to eastern Madagascar.

Rhombophryne coronata is a terrestrial and fossorial species that inhabits primary and somewhat degraded rainforests as well as pine plantations. It is particularly associated with forests rich in moss and lichens. It is a widespread species that is moderately common in parts of its range. It is suffering from habitat loss caused by subsistence agriculture, timber extraction, charcoal production, invasive species (eucalyptus), and expanding human settlements. It occurs in the Zahamena, Andasibe-Mantadia, and Andringitra National Parks.

References

coronata
Amphibians described in 2003
Endemic frogs of Madagascar